Brickyard Cove Pond is a small lake in the Brickyard Cove District of Richmond, California. It was formed from quarrying of Nicholl's Knob the surrounding hill. It is fed by Brickyard Springs, a series of underground springs. Before the early 20th Century it was a swimming pond for local boys who often went skinny dipping at the lake. However this ceased when local cattle ranchers began dumping manure in the pond.

See also
List of lakes in California
List of lakes in the San Francisco Bay Area

References

Bodies of water of Richmond, California
Lakes of Contra Costa County, California
Lakes of the San Francisco Bay Area
Lakes of California
Lakes of Northern California